Densa has been used as the name of a number of fictional organizations parodying Mensa International, the organization for highly intelligent people. Densa is ostensibly an organization for people insufficiently intelligent to be members of Mensa. The name Densa has been said to be an acronym for "Diversely Educated Not Seriously Affected."

There is no single formal Densa organization; instead, various projects using that name exist as informal groups, usually meant by their founders as a joke rather than a serious organization. Even within Mensa itself, a SIG (special interest group, an informal sub-group of Mensans sharing a particular common interest) has existed for Densa, which, like all Mensa SIGs, required Mensa membership for admission, while it was active.

The concept of an organization for the mentally dense originated in Boston & Outskirts Mensa Bulletin (BOMB), August 1974, in "A-Bomb-inable Puzzle II" by John D. Coons. The puzzle involved "The Boston chapter of Densa, the low IQ society". Subsequent issues had additional puzzles with gags about the group and were widely reprinted by the bulletins of other Mensa groups before the concept of a low IQ group gained wider circulation in the 1970s, with other people creating quizzes, etc.

A humor book called The Densa Quiz: The Official & Complete Dq Test of the International Densa Society was written in 1983 by Stephen Price and J. Webster Shields.

References

Intelligence
Parodies
Mensa International